Qadirpur gas field is one of the major gas reserves of Pakistan.

Discovered in March 1990, it is a joint venture between Oil and Gas Development Company, KUFPEC Pakistan B.V., PKP Exploration Ltd (Premier Oil), PKP2 Exploration Ltd (KUFPEC) and Petroleum Pakistan Limited, each holding 75%, 8.5%, 4.75%, 4.75% and 7% respectively.

The Qadirpur gas field is currently one of OGDCL largest operated gas producing fields, accounting for 34%, 32% and 29% of OGDCL net gas production for 2012, 2013 and 2014, respectively. The field is located 8 km from Ghotki, 70 km northeast of Sukkur and 100 km east of Jacobabad in Sindh province.its it is located from main (90 km, sadiqabad = karachi, 540 km) highway road stop ahmed ki, 4 km away inside. Gas production on this field commenced in September 1995 by Prime Minister Benazir Bhutto after the installation of gas gathering facilities and processing plants. Of the 70 wells that have been drilled at this field, 57 are currently producing wells. Six have been abandoned, five are shut-in and two are water disposal wells. The field's main customers are Sui Northern Gas Pipelines Limited, Engro Powergen Qadirpur Limited near Ghotki and Liberty Power Limited Daharki (320 mW power supply generating).

In order to address declining reservoir pressures, gas compression facilities were being installed at the field to maintain sales gas supply at contractual delivery pressures.

The natural gas is purified by a membrane separation process that removes water vapor and carbon dioxide. The processing equipment was supplied by Honeywell’s UOP Separex™ Membrane Systems division. The process consists of ten trains of membrane skids, each containing many spiral-wound membrane elements.

Development drilling at Qadirpur is continuing to maintain the gas supply to Southern Natural Gas PL.

Thus a front end compression project was initiated to maintain the pressure of extracted gas and completed in 2011. As a part of project, 14 Waukesha engine driven Reciprocating compressors were installed by Valerus company. Later, 3 solar turbine driven centrifugal compressors were also installed which were previously working at Pirkoh gas field (Balochistan).

Ownership group led by: Oil & Gas Development Company Limited (OGDCL);
Location: Qadirpur, Ghotki, Sindh, Pakistan
Completion Date:  August 1995

See also

Fuel extraction in Pakistan

References

External links
Oil and Gas Development Company Limited Website
Dawn News Website
Express Tribune Website

Natural gas fields in Pakistan